In enzymology, a pyrimidine-5'-nucleotide nucleosidase is an enzyme that catalyzes the chemical reaction

a pyrimidine 5'-nucleotide + H2O  D-ribose 5-phosphate + a pyrimidine base

Thus, the two substrates of this enzyme are pyrimidine 5'-nucleotide and H2O, whereas its two products are D-ribose 5-phosphate and pyrimidine base.

This enzyme belongs to the family of hydrolases, specifically those glycosylases that hydrolyse N-glycosyl compounds.  The systematic name of this enzyme class is pyrimidine-5'-nucleotide phosphoribo(deoxyribo)hydrolase. Other names in common use include pyrimidine nucleotide N-ribosidase, and Pyr5N.  This enzyme participates in pyrimidine metabolism.

References

 
 

EC 3.2.2
Enzymes of unknown structure